The Batman comic strip began on October 25, 1943, a few years after the creation of the comic book Batman. At first titled Batman and Robin, a later incarnation was shortened to Batman. The comic strip had three major and two minor runs in American newspapers.

Batman and Robin (1943–1946)
The first series was written by Bob Kane and others. It was published as both a daily strip and a Sunday strip. This series has been reprinted by DC Comics and Kitchen Sink Press in one paperback volume of Sunday strips and three paperback volumes of daily strips. It was distributed by the McClure Syndicate. The strip ended on November 2, 1946.

From Joe Desris's introduction to the first book of daily reprints: "...this newspaper strip, Batman and Robin,...has important historical significance: It is the last large body of work that Batman creator Bob Kane penciled completely solo...and it contains stories by all of the significant writers from the first five, formative years of the feature’s history: Don Cameron, Bill Finger, Jack Schiff and Alvin Schwartz.”

Batman and Robin (1953)
The second series was written by Walter B. Gibson and was published on Sunday only, in September 1953. This short-lived attempt to revive the Batman comic strip ran only in Arrow, the Family Comic Weekly, which was edited by Gibson. A few of these very rare strips are reprinted in the book Batman: The Sunday Classics 1943–46.

Batman with Robin the Boy Wonder (1966–1973)
Although it was credited to "Bob Kane", this series was actually ghostwritten, as noted below. The strip ran on Sunday from May 29, 1966, to July 13, 1969, and daily from May 30, 1966, to 1973. At first, this series was a campy revival drawing on the popularity of the Batman TV show, as exemplified by the guest appearance of celebrities like Jack Benny and public figures like Conrad Hilton. Later, it told more serious Batman stories and featured guest appearances by Batgirl, Superman and Aquaman. A 1970 sequence featuring the Green Arrow and the Man-Bat was reprinted in Amazing World of DC Comics #4-5 (1975). It was syndicated by the Ledger Syndicate.

Episode guide

The Sunday strips ended July 13, 1969. The daily strips continued and were drawn by Plastino through Jan. 1, 1972, with Nick Cardy assisting on the art toward the end. They were written by Ellsworth until July 1970 and then by E. Nelson Bridwell. E. M. Stout took over the strip on January 3, 1972. Batman and Robin continued to appear in the strip, but were now teamed up with a new hero called Galexo until it ended in 1973.

This series was reprinted by The Library of American Comics in a three-volume collection which began in 2014 and was titled Batman - Silver Age Newspaper Comics.

The World's Greatest Superheroes (1978–1985)
From April 3, 1978, to February 10, 1985, Batman appeared in a strip variously titled The World's Greatest Superheroes, The World's Greatest Superheroes Present Superman, and The Superman Sunday Special. It was syndicated by the Chicago Tribune/New York News Syndicate. For information on writers and artists, see Batman: the Sunday Classics 1943–46.

Batman (1989–1991)
The most recent revival of the strip, titled simply Batman, ran Sunday and daily from November 6, 1989, to August 3, 1991. The first story was written by Max Allan Collins and drawn by Marshall Rogers. All of the other stories were written by William Messner-Loebs and drawn by Carmine Infantino and John Nyberg. It was syndicated by Creators Syndicate. All of these strips were reprinted in Comics Revue.

Episode guide
 "Catwoman"
 "The Penguin"
 "The Joker"
 "Two-Face"
 "Robin"
 "The Riddler"
 "The Mad Hatter"

References

External links
A Change of Costume (2/11/46 - 3/23/46) part 1 part 2 part 3 part 4 part 5 part 6 part 7
 part 8 part 9 part 10 part 11 part 12 part 13
 part 14 part 15 part 16 part 17 part 18 
1966 Batman and Robin Comic Strips based on the television show (Penguin storyline from 1966 Sunday strip debut)
January 7, 1967, strip with Conrad Hilton
Jack Benny Meets Batman
Spotlight: Batman Comic Strip (1970 sequence reprinted in Amazing World of DC Comics #4)
Galexo Found!
Obscurity of the Day: Batman (samples of the 1989-1991 strip)

1943 comics debuts
1946 comics endings
1953 comics debuts
1966 comics debuts
1974 comics endings
1989 comics debuts
1991 comics endings
American comic strips
Batman titles
Batman in other media
Comic strip duos
Superhero comic strips